Nicolaus Olai Bothniensis (born about 1550 in Piteå, died 18 May 1600) was Archbishop of Uppsala in the Church of Sweden 1599–1600. He was appointed in place of Abraham Angermannus who had been put in prison, but before getting inducted he died of a sickness, about 50 years old. 

In his younger days he had been a student at the University of Rostock  and had made extensive travels through Europe. 

Like Angermannus, Bothniensis had for a while been imprisoned because of his resistance to King John III of Sweden's non-Lutheran liturgy, but he had been finally released in the fall of 1592 after a total time of 1,5 years.

He became dean in Uppsala and the first professor of theology at the university there in 1593. Bothiensis was described as a fine man of high moral standards.

See also 
 List of Archbishops of Uppsala

References 

 Svenskt Biografiskt Handlexikon (1906), article Bothniensis In Swedish
 Nordisk Familjebok, 2n ed., vol 19 (1913), col. 940ff (in Swedish)

1550 births
1600 deaths
People from Piteå
Lutheran archbishops of Uppsala
16th-century Swedish people
17th-century Swedish people